Omar Ignacio Paganini Herrera (born 2 June 1962) is an Uruguayan electrical engineer, academic and politician of the National Party, serving as Minister of Industry, Energy and Mining under president Luis Lacalle Pou.

Graduated from the University of the Republic with a degree in Electrical Engineering, Paganini obtained a Master of Business Administration from the Catholic University of Uruguay. He also trained in Entrepreneurship at Stanford University and the University of California, Berkeley, and in Negotiation by the Global PON program at Harvard University.

Career 
In 1990 he founded an engineering and automation services company for the industry and in 1995 he settled in the department of Paysandú to take over as director of the company Paylana S.A. From 2001 to 2003, back in Montevideo, he joined Antel's ITC consultancy.

In 2003, he was appointed dean of the Faculty of Engineering of the Catholic University of Uruguay (UCU), a position he held until 2012. Later, he served as vice-rector for Economic Management and Development and in 2018 he became head of the UCU Business School. In addition, he directed the Observatory of Energy and Sustainable Development of that university, through which he has made publications and presentations in the country and in foreign universities, mainly, on the change of the energy matrix.

Minister of Industry 
Paganini was announced as Minister of Industry, Energy and Mining on December 16, 2019 by then-President-elect Luis Lacalle Pou. He took office on March 1, 2020, stating that his portfolio should be "a channel for Uruguay to take advantage of its opportunities and face its challenges." He also pointed out that the country's competitiveness is the main challenge of his management.

References

External links 

 

University of the Republic (Uruguay) alumni
Catholic University of Uruguay alumni
Academic staff of the Catholic University of Uruguay
National Party (Uruguay) politicians
Ministers of Industries, Energy and Mining of Uruguay
1962 births
Living people